Gardaland Resort is an amusement park located in northeastern Italy. Opened on 19 July 1975, the resort includes Gardaland Park, Gardaland Sea-Life, Legoland Waterpark, Gardaland Hotel, Adventure Hotel and Magic Hotel. It is adjacent to Lake Garda. Sporting both traditional attractions and entertainment shows, it attracts nearly 3 million visitors every year.

In June 2005, Gardaland was ranked fifth in Forbes Magazine's list of the top ten amusement parks in the world, with the best turnover. According to 2011 data is the eighth in Europe by the number of park visitors.

Since October 2006, the park has been owned by the British company Merlin Entertainments. Major attractions at the park include Mammut, Jungle Rapids, Fuga Da Atlantide, Shaman, Blue Tornado, Raptor and Oblivion: The Black Hole which opened on 28 March 2015. The park's mascot, Prezzemolo, was popular in the Italian licensing market during the 1990s and the 2000s.

History

Built on the eastern shore of Lake Garda at Castelnuovo del Garda, Gardaland opened on 19 July 1975, between Peschiera and Lazise.

It has expanded steadily in both size and attendance, topping 1 million visitors annually for the first time in 1984. By 2007, attendance reached 3 million. Gardaland is now the eighth-most-popular theme park in Europe, and is run and operated by the Merlin Entertainments Group. It has a total of 32 rides, including 7 roller coasters and 3 water rides. The roller coasters are Blue Tornado, Shaman, Ortobruco Tour, Raptor, Kung Fu Panda Master, Mammut and Oblivion: The Black Hole. Fuga da Atlantide is a Shoot the Chute.

The park opened a ride based on the Jumanji film franchise called Jumanji - The Adventure for the 2022 season, featuring a large animatronic figure.

Themed areas

Attractions

Roller coasters

Water rides

Dark rides

Flat thrill rides

Family rides

Other attractions

Gallery

Food, features

References

External links

 
 
 Information about Gardaland
 Gardaland's roller coasters
 Gardaland Weather

Buildings and structures in the Province of Verona
Gardaland
Merlin Entertainments Group
Amusement parks in Italy
1975 establishments in Italy
Amusement parks opened in 1975